John Hardwick (born 1965) is a British television and film director. He grew up on Merseyside and studied American Studies at Swansea University and Louisiana State University.

In television, he has directed The Trial for Channel 4, Suspects for Channel 5, Delicious for Sky 1,  Holby City for the BBC and Nearly Famous for E4. He was commissioned to shoot the third series of The Increasingly Poor Decisions of Todd Margaret for IFC in the USA.

Hardwick has made three feature films: 33x Around The Sun, a low budget art-house picture, described as "a one of a kind vision quest" by Time Out magazine, Svengali, a comedy set in the London music scene starring Jonny Owen and Vicky McClure, and Follow The Money, a documentary that follows a $10 bill for one month as it criss-crosses the United States.

Hardwick having been discovered by the band The Beekeepers then went on and directed  music videos for Arctic Monkeys, Blur, Jake Bugg, Manic Street Preachers and Noel Gallagher's High Flying Birds.

Hardwick occasionally works as a theatre director and in 2006 he directed the World Premiere of Max Frisch's Gantenbein at the Hebbel am Ufer Theater in Berlin. In 2008, he wrote and directed the afternoon play Death of a Pirate for BBC Radio 4.

Television
 Delicious - Sky 1 (4 x 45 minute episodes)
 The Increasingly Poor Decisions of Todd Margaret - IFC (6 x 30 minute episodes)
 Suspects - Channel 5 (3 x 1 hour episodes)
 Holby City - BBC (4 x 1 hour episodes)
 Regulars - Channel 4 (pilot)
 Nearly Famous - E4 (2 x 1hr episodes)
 The Trial - Channel 4 (1 x 30 minute thriller)
 Hollyoaks Later - Channel 4 (1 x 1 hour episode)
 All About Tonight - BBC (pilot)

Features
 33X Around the Sun (2005)
 Svengali (2013)
 Follow The Money (2015)

Shorts
 Wetwork (2000)
 To Have and to Hold (2000)
 Mule (2002)
 Table Dancing (2014)
 The Pitch (2015)

 Awards
 2001 Best Director - Buenos Aires International Film Festival, Argentina - To Have And To Hold 2001 Best Short - Audience Award - Cambridge Film Festival, UK - To Have And To Hold 2002 Best Short Film - Melbourne International Film Festival, Australia - Mule 2002 Best Short Film - East End Film Festival, London - Mule 2007 Nominated for The Total Theatre Award - Edinburgh Festival  - An Audience With Adrienne 2013 Nominated for The Michael Powell Award for best new British feature at EIFF - Svengali''

References

External links
 
 John Hardwick at Volcano Theatre
 John Hardwick videography at mvdbase.com
 John Hardwick at hla

1965 births
British music video directors
British film directors
People educated at Wirral Grammar School for Boys
Living people